Dhanda is a surname. Notable people with surname include:
Mahipal Dhanda, Indian politician
Meena Dhanda, Indian philosopher
Parmjit Dhanda (born 1971), British politician
Pooja Dhanda (born 1994), Indian wrestler
Prem Chandra Dhanda (1911–2013), Indian physician
Yan Dhanda (born 1998), English footballer
Manav Dhanda Indian media personality
 Suraj Dhanda, West Midlands Dentist
Kamlesh Dhanda, Indian politician
Amarjeet Dhanda, Indian politician
Harish Dhanda, Indian Politician
Harpal Dhanda,(born 1967),Indian Businessman
Ranpal Dhanda,Unnat Feeds Director
Tarachand Dhanda,Farmer,Village Kawi,Panipat,Haryana

See also
 Dhanda, a village in Punjab